Lugdunum is a classical Roman place name, most commonly referring to one of two places:

 Lugdunum, Gaul; now Lyon, France
 Lugdunum Batavorum, a castellum on the mouth of the Rhine river near Katwijk, Netherlands

Other places:
 Lugdunum Convenarum, now Saint-Bertrand-de-Comminges, France
 Lugdunum Clavatum, now Laon, France
 Lugdunum Consoranorum, now Saint-Lizier, France

Lugdunum may also refer to:
 Lugdunum (museum), formerly the Gallo-Roman Museum of Lyon-Fourvière, in Lyons, France
 Lugdunum Server, a server software for the EDonkey network